The Gulden was the currency of the Free City of Danzig between 1923 and 1939. It was divided into 100 Pfennige.

History
Until 1923, Danzig used the German Papiermark and issued several local 'emergency notes'. Inflation during 1922–23 averaged roughly 2,440% per month. In July 1923 it was announced that a new and independent currency (the gulden) was being established with the approval of the League of Nations finance committee to replace the German mark. The gulden was introduced at a value of 25 gulden = 1 pound sterling.

Incorporation into Nazi Germany
Danzig, separated from Germany after World War I, was annexed by Nazi Germany on 1 September 1939, the day the invasion of Poland had begun On the same day reichsmark coins and notes were declared legal tender alongside the Danzig gulden, with 1 gulden being equal to 0.70 reichsmark. This was a favourable exchange rate for inhabitants of Danzig, since the actual exchange rate was around 0.47 reichsmark per gulden. To prevent abuse on 7 September the import of gulden coins and notes into the territory of the former free city was prohibited. Bank assets were however converted at the market rate of 0.47 reichsmark per gulden.

With effect on 7 September 1939, coins of 1 and 2 pfennige became legal tender throughout Nazi Germany as 1 and 2 reichspfennige, and would remain in circulation until November 1940. On 30 September the reichsmark became the sole currency on the territory of the former free city. Notes and coins of 5 and 10 gulden were withdrawn that day and could be exchanged for reichsmarks until 15 October.

Coins
The first series of coins was issued in 1923, followed by a second in 1932.

The 25-gulden coins were minted in gold. Produced in very small numbers in 1923 (1,000) and 1930 (4,000), the latter date's issue was only released as a few presentation pieces. As part of the 1923 series are 200 proof coins and, while available to collectors, are very expensive. The 1930 issue was essentially unobtainable until a large number appeared in the 1990s, apparently released from a Russian treasury where they had been stored since their capture at the end of World War II.

Banknotes
The first Danzig gulden banknotes were issued by the Danzig Central Finance Department and dated 22 October 1923 with a second issue dated 1 November 1923. Denominations for both series included 1, 2, 5, 10, 25, and 50-pfennige notes, as well as 1, 2, and 5 gulden. In addition, the first issue contained 10 and 25-gulden notes, and the second issue contained 50 and 100-gulden notes. The Bank of Danzig was capitalized with £300,000 on 5 February 1924 and officially opened on 17 March 1924. The Bank of Danzig issued four series of gulden (1924, 1928–30, 1931–32, and 1937–38) with an initial issue date of 10 February 1924.

References

Notes

Sources

Free City of Danzig
Modern obsolete currencies
Currencies of Germany
Currencies of Poland
1923 establishments in the Free City of Danzig
1939 disestablishments